Boris Varga (born 14 August 1993) is a Serbian footballer who plays as a defender.

Career 
On 3 July 2022, Pyunik announced the signing of Varga. On 29 December 2022, Varga left Pyunik.

References

External links
 
 
 Boris Varga stats at utakmica.rs

1993 births
Living people
People from Vrbas, Serbia
Association football defenders
Serbian footballers
Serbia youth international footballers
FK Hajduk Kula players
FK Inđija players
FK Proleter Novi Sad players
FK ČSK Čelarevo players
FK Napredak Kruševac players
OFK Bačka players
FK TSC Bačka Topola players
Serbian First League players
Serbian SuperLiga players